The Embassy of Italy in Tirana is the embassy of Italy in Albania, in the capital city of Tirana. The embassy is charged with diplomacy and Albania–Italy relations. The Italian Ambassador to Albania is the head of the diplomatic mission of Italy to Albania.

References

External links
Official website

Tirana
Albania–Italy relations
Italy